The London House was a jazz club and restaurant in Chicago located at the corner of Wacker Drive and Michigan Avenue, in the London Guaranty and Accident Company Building, 360 N. Michigan Ave. It was one of the foremost jazz clubs in the country, once home to successful jazz artists  including Oscar Peterson, Ramsey Lewis, Bill Evans, Dave Brubeck, Marian McPartland, Dinah Washington,  Cannonball Adderley, Erroll Garner, Ahmad Jamal, Nancy Wilson, Barbara Carroll and Bobby Short. On the occasion of its 20th anniversary in November 1966, Frank Sinatra Jr. headlined the club in his Chicago debut.

Renovated in 1946 by George and Oscar Marienthal, the club was crafted from the original Fort Dearborn Grill. Known as a "famed dining spot" the club was revamped in 1955 to include jazz music and stay open until 4 A.M. rather than be a strictly dining establishment that closed at 10 P.M. After jazz had finally waned as popular music, losing out to rock and roll, The London House closed during the early 1970s. The London House was turned into a Burger King in the 1970s. 

The LondonHouse Hotel opened in the building in 2016.

Recorded at London House
The following were recorded at the London House.

 1956 – Billy Taylor at the London House
 1958 – Marian McPartland, Marian McPartland Trio: At the London House
 1958 – Sarah Vaughan, After Hours at the London House
 1959 – Gene Krupa, Big Noise From Winnetka, Gene Krupa At The London House
 1959 – Bobby Hackett, Live from London House
 1959 – Johnny Pate, A Date With Johnny Pate
 1960s- Teddy Wilson and Earl Hines, Live at London House
 1961 – Tyree Glenn, Tyree Glenn at the London House in Chicago
 1961 – Oscar Peterson, The Sound of the Trio
 1961 – Oscar Peterson, Something Warm
 1961 - The Many Faces of Dorothy Donegan
 1961 - Henry Red Allen Quartet Live at the London House Chicago
 1962 – Charlie Shavers Live at the London House
 1963 – Coleman Hawkins at the London House
 1966 – The Three Sounds - Today's Sounds
 1969 – The Soulful Strings - Back By Demand, In Concert
 1969 – Jack McDuff, Gin and Orange
 1973 – Jo Jones, Jo Jones And Guest Stars

References

Restaurants in Chicago
Jazz clubs in Chicago
Defunct restaurants in the United States
Defunct jazz clubs in Illinois